Timothy Pataki is an American political aide who served as the director of the Office of Public Liaison from 2019 to 2021. Pataki previously served as Special Assistant to President Donald Trump and Deputy Director of the Office of Public Liaison, serving under Justin Clark.

Early life and education 
Pataki was born on April 2, 1985 in Baltimore, Maryland. After graduating from Loyola Blakefield, he earned a Bachelor of Arts degree in Communications from Ohio State University, where he played on the Ohio State Buckeyes men's lacrosse team.

Career 
Pataki began his career in politics as a legislative aide to Kevin McCarthy during his time as House Majority Leader. He also served as a floor aide to Eric Cantor, and as a staffer for the United States House Committee on Energy and Commerce.

References 

1985 births
Assistants to the President of the United States
Living people
People from Baltimore
Ohio State Buckeyes men's lacrosse players
Trump administration personnel
United States congressional aides